Manubhai Nandlal Amersey was an Indian politician. He was elected to the Lok Sabha, the lower house of the Parliament of India from Banaskantha, Gujarat.

References

External links
Official biographical sketch in Parliament of India website

Swatantra Party politicians
Lok Sabha members from Gujarat
India MPs 1967–1970
1928 births
Possibly living people